Commissioner of Public Lands may refer to
New Mexico Commissioner of Public Lands, New Mexico, U.S.
Stephanie Garcia Richard, assumed office January 1, 2019
Washington Commissioner of Public Lands, the head of the Department of Natural Resources, Washington, U.S.

See also
Bureau of Land Management, an agency within the United States Department of the Interior
Department of Natural Resources (disambiguation)
Public land, land held by central or local governments